The 1946 Soviet football championship was the 14th seasons of competitive football in the Soviet Union and the 8th among teams of sports societies and factories. Among the worst teams of the top tier before the World War II, CDKA Moscow won the championship becoming the Soviet domestic champions for the first time.

The defending champions Dinamo once again had a slow start in the first half and were not able to regain their champion pace in the second half as well almost placing third behind clubmates from Tbilisi.

In 1946 there was reintroduced the third tier for a season, status of which is not determined and data for which is sparse.

Honours

Notes = Number in parentheses is the times that club has won that honour. * indicates new record for competition

Soviet Union football championship

First Group

Second Group

Subgroup South

Subgroup East
All Russia

Tier final
 [Sep 18, 22] 
 
 VVS Moskva   3-2 1-0 Pishchevik Moskva

Top goalscorers

1st Group
Aleksandr Ponomarev (Torpedo Moscow) – 18 goals

2nd Group
Aleksandr Surianinov (Torpedo Gorkiy) – 14 goals

Third Group (Russian SFSR)

West
 Dinamo Riga
 Kirovskiy Zavod Leningrad
 DO Leningrad
 Spartak Kaunas
 Dinamo Tallinn
 Stroitel Moscow
 Energiya Moscow
 Aeroflot Moscow
 DO Petrozavodsk

Center
 Zenit Kaliningrad
 Zenit Kovrov
 Spartak Podolsk
 Traktor Liubetsy
 Zenit Tula
 Krasnoye Znamia Orekhovo-Zuyevo
 Dinamo Yaroslavl
 Spartak Kursk
 Dinamo Oryol
 Dinamo Voronezh

Lower Volga
 Dinamo Saratov
 ODO Kuybyshev
 Pischevik Astrakhan
 Lokomotiv Kuybyshev
 Dinamo Stalingrad
 ZiV Kuybyshev
 Traktor Penza

Volga
 Krylia Sovetov Gorkiy
 Zenit Izhevsk
 Krasnaya Etna Gorkiy
 Azot Dzerzhinsk
 Spartak Ivanovo
 Dinamo Gorkiy
 Dinamo Kazan
 DO Gorkiy

Ural
 Dinamo Sverdlovsk
 Dinamo Cheliabinsk
 Dinamo Molotov
 Dzerzhinets Nizhniy Tagil
 Lokomotiv Tyumen
 Metallurg Vostoka Pervouralsk
 Tsvetmet Kamensk-Uralsky
 Metallurg Vostoka Lysva

Sibir
 Krylia Sovetov Novosibirsk
 Krylia Sovetov Omsk
 Traktor Barnaul
 Dinamo Novosibirsk
 Metallurg Vostoka Stalinsk-Kuznetsk
 Traktor Novosibirsk
 Ugolschik Prokopyevsk
 Azot Kemerovo

Northern Caucasus
 Dinamo Krasnodar
 Dinamo Stavropol
 Traktor Taganrog
 SKA Rostov-na-Donu
 Dinamo Nalchik
 Dinamo Groznyi
 Dinamo Makhachkala
 Dinamo Dzaudzhikau

Far East
 Dinamo Khabarovsk
 Dinamo Komsomolsk-na-Amure
 DOF Vladivostok
 DKA Khabarovsk
 Dinamo Chita
 Lokomotiv Irkutsk

Play-offs for the Final group
 Dinamo Saratov v Dinamo Krasnodar 2–0
 Krylia Sovetov Gorkiy v Dinamo Sverdlovsk 1–1, 1–3
 Krylia Sovetov Novosibirsk v Dinamo Khabarovsk 2–1

Final
 Dinamo Riga
 Zenit Kaliningrad
 Dinamo Sverdlovsk
 Dinamo Saratov
 Krylia Sovetov Novosibirsk

Third Group (Union republics)

Ukraine

 Spartak Uzhgorod
 DO Kiev
 Dzerzhinets Kharkiv
 Bolshevik Zaporozhye

Belarus
 DO Minsk
 Spartak Bobruisk
 Lokomotiv Grodno
 Dinamo-2 Minsk
 Lokomotiv Gomel
 DO Baranovichi
 Lokomotiv Brest

Caucasus
 Krylia Sovetov Tbilisi
 Dinamo Sukhumi
 Dinamo Batumi
 Dinamo Kutaisi
 Dinamo Baku
 Spartak Yerevan
 Dinamo Leninakan

Central Asia
 Dinamo Alma-Ata
 DO Tashkent
 Lokomotiv Ashkhabad
 Dinamo Stalinabad
 Dinamo Frunze

Final
 Spartak Uzhgorod
 Krylia Sovetov Tbilisi
 Dinamo Alma-Ata
 DO Minsk
 DO Kiev

Republican level
Football competitions of union republics

Football championships
 Azerbaijan SSR – Lokomotiv Baku
 Armenian SSR – Dinamo Yerevan
 Belarusian SSR – ODO Minsk (see Football Championship of the Belarusian SSR)
 Estonian SSR – Baltflot Tallin
 Georgian SSR – Dinamo Kutaisi
 Kazakh SSR – Dinamo Alma-Ata
 Karelo-Finish SSR – unknown
 Kirgiz SSR – none
 Latvian SSR – Daugava Liepaja
 Lithuanian SSR – Dinamo Kaunas
 Moldavian SSR – Dinamo Kishinev
 Russian SFSR – unknown
 Tajik SSR – none
 Turkmen SSR – Dinamo Ashkhabad
 Uzbek SSR – none
 Ukrainian SSR – Spartak Uzhhorod (see Football Championship of the Ukrainian SSR)

Football cups
 Azerbaijan SSR – none
 Armenian SSR – Dinamo Yerevan
 Belarusian SSR – ODO Minsk
 Estonian SSR – Dinamo Tallin
 Georgian SSR – Burevestnik Tbilisi
 Kazakh SSR – none
 Karelo-Finish SSR – unknown
 Kirgiz SSR – none
 Latvian SSR – Daugava Liepaja
 Lithuanian SSR – none
 Moldavian SSR – Dinamo Kishinev
 Russian SFSR – Dinamo Sverdlovsk
 Tajik SSR – Dinamo Stalinabad
 Turkmen SSR – Dinamo Ashkhabad
 Uzbek SSR – DO Tashkent
 Ukrainian SSR – FC Dynamo Kyiv (see 1946 Cup of the Ukrainian SSR)

References

External links
 1946 Soviet football championship. RSSSF